This is a list of settlements in the Thessaloniki regional unit, Greece:

 Adam
 Adendro
 Agia Paraskevi
 Agia Triada
 Agios Antonios
 Agios Athanasios
 Agios Charalambos
 Agios Pavlos
 Agios Vasileios
 Akropotamos
 Ampelokipoi
 Analipsi
 Anatoliko
 Anchialos
 Angelochori
 Ano Scholari
 Ano Stavros
 Anoixia
 Apollonia
 Ardameri
 Arethousa
 Areti
 Askos
 Asprovalta
 Assiros
 Asvestochori
 Avgi
 Chalastra
 Chalkidona
 Chorouda
 Chortiatis
 Chrysavgi
 Diavata
 Dorkada
 Drakontio
 Drymos
 Efkarpia
 Eleftherio-Kordelio
 Eleousa
 Epanomi
 Evangelismos
 Evosmos
 Exochi
 Filadelfio
 Filothei
 Filyro
 Galini
 Gefyra
 Gerakarou
 Irakleio
 Kalamaria
 Kalamoto
 Kalochori
 Kardia
 Karteres
 Kastanas
 Kato Scholari
 Kato Stefanina
 Kavallari
 Kokkalou
 Kolchiko
 Koufalia
 Krithia
 Kryoneri
 Kymina
 Lachanas
 Lakkia
 Lagkadikia
 Lagyna
 Langadas
 Lefkochori
 Lefkouda
 Liti
 Limni
 Livadi
 Lofiskos
 Loudias
 Loutra Volvis
 Mavrorrachi
 Mavrouda
 Megali Volvi
 Melissochori
 Melissourgos
 Menemeni
 Mesaio
 Mesimeri
 Mesokomo
 Mesopotamo
 Mikra Volvi
 Mikrokomi
 Mikro Monastiri
 Modi
 Monolofo
 Monopigado
 Nea Apollonia
 Nea Filadelfeia
 Nea Kallindoia
 Nea Kerasia
 Nea Madytos
 Nea Magnisia
 Nea Malgara
 Nea Mesimvria
 Nea Michaniona
 Nea Raidestos
 Nea Vrasna
 Neapoli
 Neo Rysio
 Neochorouda
 Neoi Epivates
 Nikomidino
 Nikopoli
 Nymfopetra
 Oraiokastro
 Ossa
 Paliampela
 Panorama
 Partheni
 Pefka
 Pentalofos
 Pente Vryses
 Peraia
 Peristera
 Peristerona
 Perivolaki
 Petrokerasa
 Petroto
 Plagiari
 Plateia
 Polichni
 Polydendri
 Prochoma
 Profitis
 Pylaia
 Sarakina
 Scholari
 Sindos
 Skepasto
 Sochos
 Souroti
 Spitakia
 Stavros
 Stavroupoli
 Stefania
 Stefanina
 Stivos
 Sykies
 Tagarades
 Thermi
 Thessaloniki
 Triandria
 Trilofos
 Vaiochori
 Valtochori
 Vamvakia 
 Vasilika
 Vasiloudi
 Vathylakkos
 Vertiskos
 Volvi
 Vrachia
 Vrasna
 Xirochori
 Xiropotamos
 Xylopoli
 Zagliveri

By municipality

Kalamaria (no subdivisions)

See also

List of towns and villages in Greece

 
Thessaloniki